The English Illustrated Magazine was a monthly publication that ran for 359 issues between October 1883 and August 1913. Features included travel, topography, and a large amount of fiction and were contributed by writers such as Thomas Hardy, Henry James, Emeric Hulme Beaman, Stanley J. Weyman and Max Pemberton. Illustrators included Walter Crane, Carlo Perugini, Alma-Tadema, Louis Davis and Louis Wain.  When it began publication, it was the only illustrated competitor to Cassell's Magazine.

Editors 
 J. Comyns Carr (October 1883 – September 1889)
 Clement Kinloch-Cooke (October 1889 – September 1893)
 Clement King Shorter (October 1893 – August 1899)
 Bruce Ingram (September 1899 – September 1901)
 Hannaford Bennett (October 1901 – March 1903)
 Oscar Parker (March 1905 – August 1913)

Gallery

References and sources
References

Sources

External links
 The English Illustrated Magazine Internet Archive - online

Defunct literary magazines published in the United Kingdom
Magazines established in 1883
Magazines disestablished in 1913
Monthly magazines published in the United Kingdom